"And I don't care what it is" is a phrase attributed to U.S. President Dwight Eisenhower, and often misquoted. For example, one encyclopedia says: "Eisenhower once remarked that 'America makes no sense without a deeply held faith in God—and I don't care what it is. Some commentators, such as Will Herberg, argued that Eisenhower favored a generic, watered-down religion, or ridiculed Eisenhower's banality. What Eisenhower actually said, when he was President-elect, was that the American form of government since 1776 was based on Judeo-Christian moral values. Speaking extemporaneously on December 22, 1952, a month before his inauguration, Eisenhower actually said:

In a 1981 article regarding the quote, Professor Patrick Henry concluded that the line meant that Eisenhower was including other religious possibilities, such as a Buddhist democracy.

Eisenhower at the time was not a church member. Born into a family of Pennsylvania Dutch Mennonites, Eisenhower's decision to pursue a military and then a political career put him at odds with the Mennonites' pacifistic traditions. He became a Presbyterian in 1953, after his first election, and sponsored prayers at cabinet sessions and held prayer breakfasts. When the local minister boasted that Eisenhower was joining his church, the president exploded to his press secretary, "You go and tell that goddamn minister that if he gives out one more story about my religious faith I will not join his goddamn church!"

See also
 American civil religion

Notes

References

Further reading
 

1950s neologisms
1952 in American politics
American political catchphrases
Political quotes
Presidency of Dwight D. Eisenhower
Religion and society in the United States